Woodside Energy Group Ltd (formerly Woodside Petroleum Ltd) is an Australian petroleum exploration and production company. Woodside is the operator of oil and gas production in Australia and also Australia's largest independent dedicated oil and gas company. It is a public company listed on the Australian Securities Exchange and has its headquarters in Perth, Western Australia. In the 2020 Forbes Global 2000, Woodside was ranked as the 1328th-largest public company in the world.

History
Woodside was incorporated on 26 July 1954. It was originally established as Woodside (Lakes Entrance) Oil Co NL, a no liability company (NL), was named after the small town of Woodside, Victoria. The company was floated by accountant Rees Withers, whose firm serviced a number of small exploration companies in Gippsland where Australia's first oil field had been discovered. The company initially struggled to raise funds after a lack of initial success. In 1956, stockbroker Geoff Donaldson, who had underwritten the initial share offer, joined Woodside as chairman. He played a key role in keeping the company afloat in its early years.

Woodside initially focused its exploration activities on Victoria's Gippsland Basin. In 1962 the company recruited Nicholas Boutakoff as chief geologist, who turned the company's activities towards Western Australia. He correctly hypothesised that the North West Shelf contained petroleum reserves, and in 1962 Woodside applied for exploration licences over a large offshore area. Woodside subsequently joined up with Shell and Burmah Oil to form the original North West Shelf Venture. BHP later replaced Burmah, and with Shell, each became a 40% shareholder in Woodside in 1985. BHP reduced its shareholding to 10% in July 1990. In October 1994, BHP sold its remaining shares while Shell sold down to 34%. In 1995, Woodside moved its head office from Melbourne to Perth.

In 2001 Shell sought to buy out the remaining portion of the company that it did not already own at the time; however, the takeover move was blocked by Treasurer of Australia, Peter Costello, on national interest grounds. In November 2010, Shell reduced its 34% stake to 24%. In November 2017, Shell sold its remaining shares.

In August 2021, Woodside entered into an agreement with BHP to merge the latter's oil and gas assets with Woodside. The deal is subject to regulatory and shareholder approval and has been described by environmentalists as 'a disastrous outcome for Woodside shareholders and [the] climate'.

In May 2022, the merger with the BHP oil and gas assets was approved by approximately 98% of Woodside shareholders. As of June 2022, the merger was completed and the combined entity was listed on the New York Stock Exchange and the London Stock Exchange.

Business overview
Woodside has exploration, development and operating activities in Australia and a number of international regions including Canada, United States, Senegal, South Korea, New Zealand, Myanmar, Cameroon, Gabon, Morocco and Ireland. Within Australia Woodside operates or is developing a number of liquefied natural gas projects. The company also operates the Enfield, Vincent and Pyrenees oil fields offshore from Exmouth in Western Australia.

Sunrise LNG development
The Greater Sunrise gas development lies in the Timor Sea north of Australia and includes the Sunrise and Troubadour fields, which were discovered in 1974. Approximately 80% of the fields lie within Australian waters, with the remainder in jointly administered waters. The Sunrise JV participants are Woodside (operator) (33.4%), ConocoPhillips (30%), Shell (26.6%) and Osaka Gas (10%).

In April 2010 Shell's floating liquefied natural gas technology was selected by the Sunrise Joint Venture for developing the Greater Sunrise gas fields in the Timor Sea. The Woodside-operated JV is now seeking to engage regulators on the concept selection process.

Australia Oil
Woodside owns and operates a number of oil developments offshore Western Australia, including the Ngujima-Yin FPSO, the Pyrenees FPSO, and the Okha FPSO.

Burrup Hub
Woodside Energy Group also has Burrup Hub, the largest fossil fuel project currently proposed in Australia, involving the extraction of six untapped gas fields and the drilling of 84 wells off the Western Australian coast.

Criticism
In February 2006, the Mauritanian military junta led by Ely Ould Mohamed Vall denounced amendments to an oil contract made by former president Maaouya Ould Sid'Ahmed Taya with Woodside Petroleum. In 2004, Woodside had agreed to invest US$600 million in developing Mauritania's Chinguetti offshore oil project. The controversial amendments, which Mauritanian authorities declared had been signed "outside the legal framework of normal practice, to the great detriment of our country", could cost Mauritania up to $200 million a year. In June 2006, the Australian Federal Police were investigating Woodside for allegations of bribery and corruption in Mauritania.

In 2006–2007, as part of the Pluto LNG project, Woodside faced opposition over plans to build an onshore processing plant on the Burrup Peninsula in Western Australia, as the site is home to significant petroglyphs up to 30,000 years old.

It has been suggested that intense lobbying by Woodside Petroleum contributed to the coalition Howard government's initial decision against emissions trading in August 2000. The company also opposed the Rudd Labor government's Carbon Pollution Reduction Scheme in 2009.

Woodside is among six companies accused of making deceptive public statements in an attempt to get free carbon permits. The Australian Conservation Foundation says the companies exaggerated in public, but told a different story to their shareholders and investors. In June 2009, the ACF lodged an official complaint with the Federal consumer affairs watchdog asking that the matter be investigated. The Australian Competition & Consumer Commission took no action against the companies.

In April 2011 Australia's Fair Work Ombudsman began an investigation into claims that foreign workers were underpaid on two North West Shelf oil rigs operated by Woodside Petroleum. In April 2013, the Federal Court in WA heard allegations that the workers were paid less than $3 an hour to work on the oil rigs. Documents tendered to the court claimed that the four men worked as painters on Woodside rigs on the North West Shelf off northern WA from July 2009 until early 2011.

In the corporation's annual offshore performance report, published in mid-2013, the failure of an oil mist detector at Woodside Petroleum's Vincent oilfield in Western Australia was caused by faulty wiring and inadequately designed equipment. The issue was identified during a visit by a third party at Woodside's largest single source of oil production.

In April 2016, Woodside concealed a 10 500 litre oil spill off the coast of Western Australia, which went on for two months without anyone from the company noticing. Woodside’s responsibility only came to light after intense public pressure.
In March 2019, Woodside led a lobbying effort to force the Western Australia EPA to abandon new guidelines to protect the climate. The Australian Centre for Corporate Responsibility described the affair as a ‘week of shame.’

In mid-2020, Woodside tried to avoid decommissioning costs by convincing regulators that dumping all the equipment from its Echo-Yodel field, including 400 tonnes of plastic, under the pretence of the waste being an 'artificial reef'. The same year, after calls to pay over $200 million to clean up an old gas processing facility they had decommissioned, Woodside convinced the government to instead grant them millions of taxpayer dollars, through a shadowy limited tender process, to ‘consult’ on the clean up. Woodside have attracted condemnation for their role in the wiretapping of the East Timor government in order to "force East Timor, one of the poorest countries in the world, to surrender most of the revenues" to Woodside.

James Price Point gas industrial complex
The "Save The Kimberley" campaign was an organised protest against Woodside's involvement with a proposal to construct the James Price Point gas industrial complex in Western Australia's Kimberley region. A protest concert was held at Federation Square in October 2012, followed by a second event in early 2013 at Esplanade Park, Fremantle that featured Bob Brown, former leader of the Australian Greens political party. A march to protest the proposed gas refinery construction at James Price Point accompanied the Fremantle concert, and campaign supporters were photographed with banners and placards.

The proposal was eventually abandoned in April 2013, but the $1.5 billion social benefits package that had been brokered between the Kimberley Land Council and Woodside, together with its joint-venture partners and the Barnett government, remained an ongoing issue. Criticism was directed at the corporation by those who believed that Woodside was under an obligation to pay out the full monetary sum of the package to local Aboriginal organisations and communities. Former head of the Kimberley Land Council Wayne Bergmann, who brokered the deal prior to his resignation, explained to the media: "There was no legal right to that deal; it was broached politically and now they [Woodside, the joint-venture partners and the state government] need to honour the bargain." As of 15 April 2013, Woodside had paid AU$3.7 million to Aboriginal organisations in accordance with the agreement and a Woodside spokesperson stated that the corporation would "continue to support a range of voluntary social investment activities in the West Kimberley".

Scarborough project
The project includes a floating production unit, the drilling of 13 wells, and a  pipeline to transport the gas to the onshore Pluto LNG processing facility near Karratha, which will be expanded. Production is expected to begin in 2026. The project has received environmental approval. The Murujuga Aboriginal Corporation has no role in approving such industrial projects, but there is research being undertaken as to whether increased emissions would affect the ancient rock art of the Dampier Rock Art Precinct on Murujuga.

References

External links

Companies based in Perth, Western Australia
Companies listed on the Australian Securities Exchange
Energy companies established in 1954
Natural gas companies of Australia
North West Shelf
Non-renewable resource companies established in 1954
Oil companies of Australia
1954 establishments in Australia